Miss Venezuela 1972 was the 19th edition of Miss Venezuela pageant held at Teatro Paris (now called Teatro La Campiña) in Caracas, Venezuela, on July 12, 1972.

Venevision aired the pageant for first time. Gilberto Correa and Liliana Cortijo co-hosted the event.

Results
Miss Venezuela 1972 - María Antonieta Cámpoli (Miss Nueva Esparta)
1st runner-up - Amalia Heller (Miss Sucre)
2nd runner-up - Marilyn Plessman (Miss Guárico)
3rd runner-up - Nancy Kranwinkel (Miss Amazonas)
4th runner-up - Marydée Sierraalta (Miss Falcón)

Special awards
 Miss Fotogénica (Miss Photogenic) - Marydée Sierraalta (Miss Falcón)
 Miss Amistad (Miss Friendship) - Gloria León (Miss Zulia)
 Miss Simpatía (Miss Congeniality) - (Tie) Eva Medrano (Miss Anzoátegui), Miriam Bocanegra (Miss Apure) and Valentina Villegas (Miss Miranda)

Delegates

 Miss Amazonas - Nancy de Lourdes Kranwinkel Plaza
 Miss Anzoátegui - Eva Medrano
 Miss Apure - Miriam Bocanegra
 Miss Aragua - Elizabeta Sartore Rossini
 Miss Bolívar - Gloria Gruber Figarelli
 Miss Departamento Vargas - Eiling Antonetti
 Miss Distrito Federal - Clara Gómez Velutini
 Miss Falcón - Marydée Sierraalta González
 Miss Guárico - Marilyn Plessman Martínez Stapulionis
 Miss Miranda - Valentina Villegas
 Miss Monagas - Auristela Quintero
 Miss Nueva Esparta - María Antonieta Cámpoli Prisco
 Miss Portuguesa - Luz Maria Sánchez Oraá
 Miss Sucre - Amalia Heller
 Miss Táchira - Ana Mireya Obregón
 Miss Zulia - Gloria León

External links
Miss Venezuela official website

1972 beauty pageants
1972 in Venezuela